Dalapathi is a 2018 Kannada language  film written and directed by Prashant Raj. It stars Prem Kumar and Kriti Kharbanda.

Cast

Prem Kumar as Ram
Kriti Kharbanda as Vaidhehi
Sharath Lohitashwa as Adhipathi
Chikkanna
Padmaja Rao
Krishi Thapanda
Sanketh Kashi
Srinivas Prabhu

Soundtrack 
The songs are composed by Charan Raj.

Reception

The Times of India gave 2.5 out of 5 stars praising the cinematographer and the dialogues and scenes in the film. Similarly, The New Indian Express gave 2.5 criticizing the climax and the flow.

References

External links

2010s Kannada-language films
2018 films
Films directed by Prashant Raj